The Hochschule Konstanz (Hochschule Konstanz für Technik, Wirtschaft und Gestaltung (HTWG)), is a German university located in Konstanz, Baden-Württemberg, Germany, in southern Germany close to the border with Switzerland. The university is a member of Internationale Bodensee-Hochschule (International Lake Constance University).

The Hochschule Konstanz plays a significant role among German universities of applied sciences. It is internationally well known for its outstanding achievements. The Hochschule Konstanz was named 2006 as one of the best German Universities of Applied Sciences in higher education (HE). Its undergraduate courses in business are consistently ranked in the top 15 in Germany.

The university was established in 1906 by Alfred Wachtel and named the "Technicum Konstanz", meaning Technical School of Constance. Initially there were only three departments: engineering, technical studies, and the school for 'Werkmeister' - post graduate work.

Faculties 
 Architecture and Design
 Civil Engineering
 Electronic and Information Technology
 Computer Sciences
 Mechanical Engineering
 Business and social sciences
 College for Foreign Students (ASK)

Bachelor majors 
 Architecture
 Applied Computer Science (replaced technical computer science and software engineering)
 Civil Engineering
 Business Administration
 Electronic and Information Technology
 Communications Design
 Mechanical Engineering/Construction and Development
 Mechanical Engineering/Production
 Transport and Environmental Technology
 Business Information Systems
 Healthcare Computer Science
 Engineering Economics in Construction
 Engineering Economics in Electrical Sciences/ Informatics
 Engineering Economics in Mechanical Engineering
 Economic Language Asia and Management in Chinese
 Economic Language Asia and Management in Malayan

Master majors 
 Architecture
 Asian-European Relations and Management
 Automotive Systems Engineering
 Civil Engineering
 Business Information Technology
 Computer Science
 Communications Design
 Mechanical Engineering and International Sales Management
 Mechatronics
 Environmental/ Production Sciences
 Engineering Economics

References

External links 

University homepage

Konstanz
Universities and colleges in Baden-Württemberg
Konstanz (district)
1906 establishments in Germany
Educational institutions established in 1906